Dan Bittman (born 29 March 1962, Bucharest) is a Romanian singer who represented the country at the Eurovision Song Contest 1994 and came 21st with 14 points.

Dan Bittman has been the lead singer of the music group, Holograf, since 1985. From November 2004 to 2012, he was the host of Dănutz SRL, a TV show on TVR 1.

Between 1984 and 1985, he was the lead singer for hard rock band IRIS.

In 2008, the artist was chosen by Disney to provide the voice of the old man from the palace in the Romanian dubbed version of the animated movie The Emperor's New Groove.

Of Jewish descent, Bittman practices Judaism.

Discography
With Blitz
 1980 - Concerteaza pentru prima data la Clubul de la ora sapte
With Incognito
 1982 - ″Ochi de cer", "Zorile", "Vine din inima mea", "Vis de pace", "Pacea florilor" - piese inregistrate pe banda de magnetofon, 1982-1984
With IRIS
 1984 - "In calea norilor", "Albina", "Sa facem daruri omului nou" - piese inregistrate pe banda de magnetofon, 1984-1985
With Holograf
 1987 - Holograf 2
 1988 - Holograf 3
 1989 - Holograf 4
 1990 - World Full of Lies
 1992 - Banii vorbesc
 1995 - Stai în poala mea
 1996 - Holograf 69 la sută unplugged
 1998 - Supersonic
 1999 - Undeva departe
 2000 - Holografica
 2001 - 69% unplugged (reeditare)
 2002 - Best Of - Dimineață în altă viață
 2003 - Pur și simplu
 2006 - Taina
 2007 - Roșu și Negru - Tribut lui Liviu Tudan
 2009 - Primăvara începe cu tine
 2012 - Love Affair
 2013 - World Full of Lies (re-lansare)
 2015 - Life Line

Solo
 1994 - Dincolo De Nori (Beyond The Clouds)
 2015 - Și îngerii au demonii lor

References

1962 births
Living people
Romanian male singers
Eurovision Song Contest entrants for Romania
Eurovision Song Contest entrants of 1994
Romanian Jews